Ciężkowice-Rożnów Landscape Park (Ciężkowicko-Rożnowski Park Krajobrazowy) is a protected area (Landscape Park) in southern Poland, established in 1995, covering an area of .

The Park lies within Lesser Poland Voivodeship: in Brzesko County (Gmina Czchów), Nowy Sącz County (Gmina Gródek nad Dunajcem, Gmina Korzenna) and Tarnów County (Gmina Ciężkowice, Gmina Gromnik, Gmina Rzepiennik Strzyżewski, Gmina Zakliczyn).

Within the Landscape Park are two nature reserves.

References 

Landscape parks in Poland
Parks in Lesser Poland Voivodeship